DCT Gdańsk - Deepwater Container Terminal Gdańsk is located in the area of Port Północy (Northern Port) in Port of Gdańsk, Poland. It was officially opened on 1 October 2007. DCT Gdańsk currently ranks as the most rapidly growing terminal in the country  and as the undisputed leader  in the handling of Polish imports and exports. It also serves as a transshipment hub for Saint Petersburg and other ports in the Baltic Sea region. Currently the handling capacity of the container terminal amounts to 3,000,000 TEU with prospect to further increase by 250,000 TEU due to conversion of additional storage area as well as container handling equipment purchase.

Important events
The DCT Gdańsk container terminal has become a springboard for the Polish Maritime Economy. However, there are several crucial events which have thus far outlined its standards and its direction of development.

 DCT Gdańsk and Maersk Line have made a breakthrough in the maritime economy on the Baltic Sea. In 2011, some of the largest container ships in the world at that time, the 14,700-TEU capacity Mærsk E-class container ships began regular weekly calls in Gdańsk. These included Evelyn Maersk, Emma Maersk, Eleonora Maersk, Ebba Maersk and Eugen Maersk
 DCT Gdańsk reached its first one millionth handling in June 2011. The millionth container ship – Emma Maersk (a flag Maersk Line container ship) made its maiden voyage to Gdańsk.
 The construction of the biggest logistics center in Poland. The multifunctional logistics center is due to be financed and constructed by the Australian Group Goodman. The initial concept for the development provides for up to 500,000 sq m of storage space and for up to 40,000 sq m of office space. The development of the logistics center will be accompanied with the extension of the local infrastructure: Sucharski Route, the tunnel at the Dead Vistula and the Gdańsk Southern Ring-Road. The connection with the modern deep-water container terminal DCT Gdańsk will serve as an advantage.
 Implementation of E-SMART – a modern tool produced by the British company International Terminal Solutions Ltd (ITS) designed for the visual management – July 2011
 Maersk Line was the first container line which introduced direct navigational connection (AE10) from the Far East to the Baltic region (while realizing exceptional opportunities of DCT Gdańsk). The direct connection of the Far East ports with Gdańsk has the following rotation: AE10 Asia–Europe–Asia: Kwangyang – Ningbo – Shanghai – Yantian – Tanjung Pelepas – Suez Canal – Rotterdam – Bremerhaven– Gdansk – Aarhus – Gothenburg – Bremerhaven – Rotterdam – Algeciras – Suez Canal – Yantian – Kwangyang;
 Award given by Maersk Line for the best terminal in Northern Europe in 2009 and in 2010. The awards: “Terminal of 2009” and "Terminal of 2010" has been given to DCT Gdańsk for its continuous leadership in monthly rankings of the terminals of Northern Europe, which Maersk Line co-operates with. The ranking covers an array of the following criteria: productivity, expectation time or intervals in handling and port costs.
 The container terminal starts to handle direct regular container connections from the Far East in January 2010.

DCT Gdańsk in the media
The container terminal regularly appears in the local, regional, national and trade media. Continuous successes draw most notable personages engaged in politics and business. As a result, the container terminal unceasingly draws the TV and press attention.

From the very beginning DCT Gdańsk has considered good communication both with the traditional media and with the social media as vital. 
That is why DCT Gdańsk may boast in the business its first internet TV which is wholly devoted to issues concerning maritime economy and effective functioning of the terminal. DCTV has already interviewed individuals like Adam Żołnowski – the director of PricewaterhouseCoopers, Eivind Holding – the Managing Director of Maersk Line, and Prof. Andruszkiewicz (the originator of DCT Gdańsk).

Sea connectivity
 Maersk Line AE10 Asia–Europe–Asia (Kwangyang – Ningbo – Shanghai – Yantian – Tanjung Pelepas – Suez Canal – Rotterdam – Bremerhaven– Gdansk – Aarhus – Gothenburg – Bremerhaven – Rotterdam – Algeciras – Suez Canal – Yantian – Kwangyang)
 Gdansk Finnish Gulf Service (Gdansk – Kotka – Helsinki – Gdansk)
 Gdansk – St. Petersburg Service (Gdansk – St. Petersburg – Gdansk)
 OOCL line LL1 Asia-North Europe Loop1 (Shanghai - Ningbo - Xiamen - Yantian - Singapore - Felixstowe - Zeebrugge - Gdansk - Wilhelmshaven - Piraeus)

Container throughput
 2007 - 4 423 TEU
 2008 - 106 469 TEU
 2009 - 162 189 TEU
 2010 - 451 730 TEU
 2011 - 634 871 TEU
 2012 - 896 962 TEU
 2013 - 1 150 887 TEU
 2014 - 1 188 380 TEU
 2015 - 1 069 705 TEU
 2016 - 1 289 842 TEU
 2017 - 1 593 761 TEU

References

External links
 Deepwater Container Terminal Gdańsk website
 https://www.youtube.com/user/DCTgdanskTV
 https://web.archive.org/web/20150930084210/http://www.itfglobal.org/en/news-events/news/2015/august/global-campaign-launched-to-end-sackings-and-union-busting-at-polish-port/

Container terminals
Buildings and structures in Gdańsk